A riddle joke, joke riddle, pseudo-joke or conundrum is a riddle that does not expect the asked person to know the answer, but rather constitutes  a set-up to the humorous punch line of the joke.

It is one of the four major types of riddles, according to Nigel F. Barley. There are many cycles of jokes in the form of a conundrum, such as Elephant jokes, "Why did the chicken cross the road?" and lightbulb jokes.

Joke cycles implying inferiority or other stereotypes of certain categories of people, such as blonde jokes, or ethnic jokes (such as Pollack joke) have a considerable amount of joke riddles.

Examples 
 Elephant joke
 Lightbulb joke
 Newspaper riddle
 "Why did the chicken cross the road?"
 Radio Yerevan jokes

Abstract riddles
In areas which have historical ties with Asia Minor, such as Greece, Turkey, Armenia, of popularity are "abstract riddles" that follow templates: "What is this: A inside and B outside?" or "What is this: A is around and B in the middle?". For example:

References

Joke cycles
Riddles